Mount Blackburn is a massive, flat-topped mountain,  high, standing just east of the Scott Glacier where it surmounts the southwest end of California Plateau and the Watson Escarpment, in the Queen Maud Mountains.

It was discovered by and named for Quin A. Blackburn, geologist, leader of the Byrd Antarctic Expedition geological party which sledged the length of Scott Glacier in December 1934.

See also  
 Roaring Ridge -  spur 3.5 nautical miles (6 km) northeast of the mountain.

References
 

Mountains of Marie Byrd Land
Queen Maud Mountains